The 1921 TCU Horned Frogs football team represented Texas Christian University (TCU) as a member of the Texas Intercollegiate Athletic Association (TIAA) during the 1921 college football season. Led by William L. Driver in his second and final year as head coach, the Horned Frogs compiled an overall record of 6–3–1 with a mark of 2–1 in TIAA play. TCU played their home games at Panther Park in Fort Worth, Texas. The team's captain was Chester Fowler, who played halfback.

Schedule

References

TCU
TCU Horned Frogs football seasons
TCU Horned Frogs football